Zhurbin is a surname. Notable people with the surname include:

Alexander Zhurbin (born 1945), Russian composer
Alexander Zhurbin (born 1992), Russian tennis player
Lev Zhurbin (born 1978), American composer and violinist